"No Way" is the first single album by Korean artist Rottyful Sky, previously known as Hanul. It is her first digital single released, following a nine-year hiatus. On 21 July 2010, a 3D music video was released. Directed by Lee Sa-gang, the video was part of Sony Korea-sponsored project, which was held at the Megabox Theater in the COEX Mall in Seoul, South Korea. The song charted on the South Korean national Gaon Weekly and Monthly Download Charts, which ranks best-selling non-physical, digital music sales. "No Way" peaked on the charts at No. 88.

Track listing

Sales chart

Release history

Video

Media appearances 
Interviews
 6 August 2010: Now TV interview
 19 August 2010: Radio interview

Music
 22 July 2010: M!Countdown
 24 July 2010: Love Power Music
 25 July 2010: Inkigayo
 31 July 2010: Music Core
 1 August 2010: Inkigayo
 6 August 2010: Music Bank
 8 August 2010: M-Wave (EP15)
 9 August 2010: tvN
 11 August 2010: M!Countdown
 12 August 2010: M!Countdown
 15 August 2010: M-Wave (EP16)
 18 August 2010: M!Countdown
 22 August 2010: M-Wave (EP17)
 23 August 2010: tvN Newton
 11 September 2010: Music Core
 19 September 2010: M-Wave (EP21)

References

External links 
 

2010 singles
2010 songs